Baburam Kunwar is the first governor of Gandaki Province. He was recommended as Governor of Gandaki Province on 13 January 2018.

Early life
Baburam Kunwar was born in Sandhikharka Municipality, Ward No. 1, Arghakhanchi, Nepal to Bhim Bahadur Kunwar and Dewaki Kunwar on 10th Shrawan, 2017 B.S..

See also
 Prof. Dr. Govinda Bahadur Tumbahang
 Ratneshwar Lal Kayastha
 Anuradha Koirala
 Durga Keshar Khanal

References

External links

Living people
Nepali Congress politicians from Lumbini Province
1960 births
People from Arghakhanchi District
Governors of Gandaki Province
Khas people